DNV (formerly DNV GL) is an international accredited registrar and classification society headquartered in Høvik, Norway. The company currently has about 12,000 employees and 350 offices operating in more than 100 countries, and provides services for several industries including maritime, oil and gas, renewable energy, electrification, food and beverage and healthcare. In 2021, DNV GL changed its name to DNV, while retaining its post-merger structure.

DNV is the world's largest classification society, providing services for 13,175 vessels and mobile offshore units (MOUs) amounting to 265.4 million gross tonnes, which represents a global market share of 21%. It is also the largest technical consultancy and supervisory to the global renewable energy (particularly wind, wave, tidal and solar) and oil and gas industry — 65% of the world's offshore pipelines are designed and installed to DNV's technical standards.

Prior to the merger, both DNV and GL had independently acquired several companies in different sectors, such as Hélimax Energy (Canada), Garrad Hassan (UK), Windtest (Germany) and KEMA (Netherlands), which now contribute to DNV's expertise across several industries. In addition to providing services such as technical assessment, certification, risk management and software development, DNV also invests heavily in research.

Remi Eriksen is the Group President and CEO of DNV since August 1, 2015, succeeding Henrik O. Madsen.

Summary 

DNV's history dates from 1864, when Det Norske Veritas was established in Norway to head technical inspection and evaluation of Norwegian merchant vessels. On the other hand, Germanischer Lloyd was founded in Hamburg around the same period in 1867 by a group of 600 ship owners, ship builders and insurers. The company celebrated its 150th anniversary in 2014.

On December 20, 2012, the two companies announced the merger, which was approved by competition authorities in South Korea, the US, the EU and China, thus allowing the merger contract between DNV and GL to be signed on September 12, 2013. The independent Det Norske Veritas Foundation owned 63.5% of DNV GL shares and Mayfair Vermögensverwaltung 36.5% until December 2017, when Mayfair sold its shares to the Det Norske Veritas Foundation. DNV GL changed it name to DNV on March 1, 2021.

Together with Bureau Veritas and American Bureau of Shipping, DNV is one of the three major companies in the classification business with 300 offices in 100 countries. The company is also a key player in strategic innovation and risk management for several other industries including renewable energy (particularly in wind and solar), oil and gas, electric power generation and distribution, petrochemicals, aviation, automotives, finance, food and beverage, healthcare, software and information technology.

Research 
Every year, DNV invests heavily in research and development, amounting to 5% of its total revenue. Since 1864, DNV has always maintained a department dedicated to research that enhances and develops services, rules and standards for various industries. Many of the innovations and findings by DNV have often been used as a basis for international standards.

As of 2021, the main research programs include maritime, power & renewables, oil & gas, precision medicine, digital assurance, ocean space, artificial intelligence and energy transition. DNV publishes its independent Energy Transition Outlook annually. The fifth edition was published in 2021.

Organization 
DNV is organised into six business areas:

 DNV — Maritime: Classification, verification, risk-management, training and technical advisory to the maritime industry on safety, enhanced performance, fuel efficiency, etc. As a classification society, DNV sets standards for ships and offshore structures, known as Class Rules. They comprise safety, reliability and environmental requirements that vessels and other offshore mobile structures in international waters must comply with. DNV is authorized by 130 maritime administrations to perform certification or verification on their behalf.
 DNV — Energy Systems: Counselling, testing, and certification services to the global energy sector, including: oil and gas, renewable energy, emissions, energy efficiency, power production, transfer, and distribution. DNV is working as an independent, accredited certifier of electricity transmission & distribution components. DNV is also the leading independent advisor and certifier to the renewable industry, notably within wind energy. Its services include wind turbine type certification, design consultancy, energy yield assessments, site assessments, permitting, solar plants and turbine design, wind and solar forecasting, and front-end engineering. In addition, DNV's energy systems arm has advisory services in energy efficiency, renewable integration, clean conventional power generation, renewable plant operations improvement services, transmission and distribution grids, energy storage, measurements and cyber security.
 DNV — Business Assurance: Certification, assessment, training/education services that support customer products, processes, and organizations over a wide spectrum of fields. DNV is an accredited certification body. They certify the compliance of companies according to a third party standard, such as ISO 9001 (quality management system) or ISO 14001 (environmental management system). DNV has issued management system certificates to more than 70,000 companies across all industry sectors and is an accredited certifier in 80 countries. They also provides accreditation and clinical excellence certifications to American hospitals.
 DNV — Supply Chain and Product Assurance: Provides supply chain governance services, product assurance and digital assurance
 DNV — Digital Solutions: A provider of engineering software tools and enterprise software for managing risk and improving safety and asset performance for ships, pipelines, processing plants, offshore structures, electric grids, smart cities, healthcare providers and a marine fleet management software solution called ShipManager.
 DNV — Accelerator: The Accelerator operates a portfolio of units undergoing significant growth, chiefly through acquisitions and partnerships.

Standards and regulations 
DNV provides a list of standards and regulations to the public:

 DNV Rules for Classification of Ships
 DNV Rules for Classification of High Speed, Light Craft
 DNV Rules for Classification of inland navigation vessels
 DNV Rules for Classification of underwater technology
 DNV Rules for Classification of offshore units and floating docs
 DNV Rules for Classification of naval vessels
 DNV Rules for Classification of yachts
 DNV Statutory Interpretations
 DNV Service Specifications
 DNV Standards
 DNV Offshore Standards (DNV-OS)
 DNV Recommended Practices
 DNV Programmes for Approval of Manufacturers
 DNV Programmes for Approval of Service Suppliers
 DNV Type Approval Programmes
 DNV Type Approval Programmes for EU recognised organisation Mutual Recognition (MR)
 DNV Class guidelines

References

External links

 
Business services companies of Norway
Ship classification societies
Companies based in Bærum
Companies established in 1864
Electrical safety standards organizations
Foundations based in Norway
Quality management
Risk management companies
Risk management software